SICONOS  is an Open Source scientific software primarily targeted at
modeling and simulating non-smooth dynamical systems (NSDS):
 Mechanical systems (Rigid body or solid) with Unilateral contact and Coulomb friction as we find in Non-smooth mechanics, Contact dynamics or Granular material.
 Switched Electrical Circuit such as Power converter, Rectifier, Phase-locked loop (PLL) or Analog-to-digital converter
 Sliding mode control systems
Other applications are found in Systems and Control (hybrid systems, differential inclusions, optimal control with state constraints), Optimization (Complementarity problem and Variational inequality) Biology Gene regulatory network, Fluid Mechanics and Computer graphics, etc.

Components 
The software is based on 3 main components
 Siconos/Numerics (C API). Collection of low-level algorithms for solving basic Algebra and optimization problems arising in the simulation of nonsmooth dynamical systems
 Linear complementarity problem (LCP)
 Mixed linear complementarity problem (MLCP)
 Nonlinear complementarity problem (NCP)
 Quadratic programming problems (QP)
 Friction-contact problems (2D or 3D) (Second-order cone programming (SOCP))
 Primal or Dual Relay problems
 Siconos/Kernel. API C++ that allows one to model and simulate the nonsmooth dynamical systems. It contains
 Dynamical systems classes :  first order one, Lagrangian systems, Newton-Euler systems
 Nonsmooth laws :  complementarity, Relay, Friction, Contact, impact
 Siconos/Front-end (API Python) Mainly an auto-generated SWIG interface of the API C++ which a special support for data structure.

Performance 
According to peer reviewed studies published by its developers, Siconos was approximately five times faster than Ngspice or ELDO (a commercial SPICE by Mentor Graphics) and 250 times faster than PLECS when solving a buck converter.

See also
  (an extension of the notion of differential equation) on which much of the NSDS theory relies
 
 
 
 
 
 , which affects ODEs/DAEs for functions with "sharp turns" and which affects numerical convergence

References

External links
The official Siconos site
 other related publications

Free software
Science software